Tomáš Staš (born 13 July 1996) is a Slovak footballer who plays for MFK Tatran Liptovský Mikuláš as a midfielder.

Club career

MFK Tatran Liptovský Mikuláš
Staš made his professional debut for MFK Tatran Liptovský Mikuláš against ŠK Slovan Bratislava on 24 July 2021.

References

External links
 MFK Tatran Liptovský Mikuláš official club profile 
 
 
 Futbalnet profile 

1996 births
Living people
Slovak footballers
Association football midfielders
MFK Tatran Liptovský Mikuláš players
Slovak Super Liga players
Sportspeople from Liptovský Mikuláš